The 41st International Emmy Awards took place on November 25, 2013, at the New York Hilton Midtown in New York City and hosted by British Comedian and actor John Oliver. The award ceremony, presented by the International Academy of Television Arts and Sciences (IATAS), honors all TV programming produced and originally aired outside the United States.

Ceremony 
Nominations for the 41st International Emmy Awards were announced on October 7, 2013, by the International Academy of Television Arts & Sciences (IATAS) at a Press Conference at Mipcom in Cannes. There are 36 nominees in 9 categories. Nominations span 19 countries: Angola, Australia, Belgium, Brazil, Canada, China, Colombia, France, Germany, Israel, Japan, Mexico, South Africa, South Korea, Sweden, New Zealand, the Philippines, the United Kingdom and Uruguay.

Brazil's TV Globo tied with the United Kingdom in the number of nominations, while Angola received his first appointment to the International Emmys in the telenovela category, for Windeck.

In addition to the presentation of the International Emmys for programming and performances, the International Academy presented two special awards. J. J. Abrams received the Founders Award and Anke Schäferkordt, Co-CEO of RTL Group and CEO of RTL Germany, received the Directorate Award.

Presenters 
The following individuals, listed in order of appearance, presented awards.

Winners and nominees

References

External links 
 
 41st International Emmy Awards

41
2013 television awards
2013 in American television